Clod Ensemble is a multi-award winning performance company and registered charity based in London, UK. Founded in 1995 by director Suzy Willson and composer Paul Clark, the company creates performances, workshops and other events in the UK and internationally.

Artistic work 
Each production has a unique visual identity and distinctive musical score, ranging from acoustic work to multi-speaker installations. Performances take place in theatre spaces, festivals, galleries and public spaces including Sadler's Wells, Tate Modern's Turbine Hall, Serralves Museum Porto and Public Theatre New York. Their work explores the relationship of music and movement, bodies and spaces. Performances sometimes draw on medical themes and the complex relationship we have with our bodies and the medical profession.

Selected performances include Silver Swan, featuring a choir of seven unaccompanied singers, Under Glass, where performers are contained within glass cases, from a jam jar to a test tube; An Anatomie in Four Quarters in which the audience cut a path through the auditorium of a large theatre; MUST, a collaboration with New York performance artist Peggy Shaw; and Red Ladies, in which a chorus of identically dressed women transform, celebrate and interrupt the familiar streets of a city.

They run a programme of education and participation projects in schools, higher education institutions and NHS Trusts. Their award-winning Performing Medicine project delivers courses, workshops and events which draw on techniques and ideas in the arts to provide training to medical students and healthcare professionals. Performing Medicine was cited an example of best practice in the 2017 report from the All-Party Parliamentary Group on Arts, Health and Wellbeing.

They are recipient of a Sustaining Excellence Grant from Wellcome Trust and are an Arts Council England National Portfolio Organisation.

Education and Participation projects 
 Performing Medicine - a sector leader in arts-based approaches to professional development in health and social care contexts
 Reboot - a programme of artist development workshops
 Living Room Music - composition masterclasses for GCSE and A Level Music students 
 Ear Opener - A youtube channel for young composers, featuring exclusive interviews with leading composers.
 Extravagant Acts for Mature People - a programme of free arts events for over 65's
 Beginners Guide to Classical Music - workshops to introduce young people to classical music through embodiment

List of Productions 

Direction and Choreography by Suzy Willson. Music by Paul Clark.

Other Productions

References

External links 
 
 performingmedicine.com

Organizations established in 1995
Charities based in London